The Forum des peuples is an annual demonstration organized since 2002 in
Mali by the Coalition des alternatives africaines dettes et développement (CAD-Mali) joining together the alter-globalists of the developing countries.

Joined together at the same time as the G8-summits, the Forum des peuples wants to be a
"popular space of education, of exchanges, of communication, of information, and of citizen actions". Furthermore, the Forum des peuples wants to come up with alternatives for the neo-liberal universe.

The first two editions were held in Siby in 2002 and 2003. The 2004 edition was held in Kita. The edition of 2005 was held from 6 to 9 July in Fana, a hundred kilometers of Bamako in the direction of Ségou. The 2006 edition took place in Gao.

External links 
 Forum des peuples site (French language)
 Meeting summary at abc.burkina.net (French language)
 Meeting summary by CADTM (French language)
 Second meeting summary by CADTM (French language)

Politics of Mali
Political organisations based in Mali
Alter-globalization